The superior rectal artery (superior hemorrhoidal artery) is an artery that descends into the pelvis to supply blood to the rectum.

Structure
The superior rectal artery is the continuation of the inferior mesenteric artery.  It descends into the pelvis between the layers of the mesentery of the sigmoid colon, crossing the left common iliac artery and vein.

It divides, opposite the third sacral vertebra into two branches, which descend one on either side of the rectum.  About 10 or 12 cm from the anus, these branches break up into several small branches.

These pierce the muscular coat of the bowel and run downward, as straight vessels, placed at regular intervals from each other in the wall of the gut between its muscular and mucous coats, to the level of the internal anal sphincter; here they form a series of loops around the lower end of the rectum, and communicate with the middle rectal artery (from the internal iliac artery) and with the inferior rectal artery (from the internal pudendal artery).

Function 
The superior rectal artery supplies the rectum and the anus.

Additional images

See also
 Middle rectal artery
 Inferior rectal artery

References

External links
  - "Branches of the inferior mesenteric artery."
  - "Intestines and Pancreas: Branches of the Inferior Mesenteric Artery"
 
 

Arteries of the abdomen